Stanisław Antoni Grochowiak, pen-name "Kain" (24 January 1934 – 2 September 1976) was a Polish poet and dramatist. His is often classified as a representative of turpism (Polish: turpizm), because of his interest in the physical, ugly and brutal, but he also exhibits strong tendencies toward formal, rhymed poetry, reaching on many occasions the ornamental grace of a baroque style.  Grochowiak was born in Leszno and died, aged 42, in Warsaw.

See also
 Polish literature

Further reading

 
 

1934 births
1976 deaths
People from Leszno
20th-century Polish poets
20th-century Polish male writers